Private Room is the third studio album by American singer Avant. It was released by Geffen Records on December 9, 2003 in the United States. The album marked his debut release under the label following the absorbance of his previous label, MCA Records, in early 2003. Avant reunited with frequent collaborator  Steve "Stone" Huff to work on the album, with additional production provided by Warryn Campbell. Upon its release, Private Room peaked at number four on the US Top R&B/Hip-Hop Albums and number 18 on the US Billboard 200. Its lead single "Read Your Mind" reached number 13 on the US Billboard Hot 100.

Critical reception

Alex Henderson from AllMusic rated the album three stars out of five. He wrote that "the same issues that weighed down Avant's previous two albums, rendering them good if uneven releases, continue to run unchecked for Private Room [...] So, once again, there's a handful of excellent contemporary R&B songs surrounded by too much material that's either decent or middling."

Track listing

Notes
  denotes co-producer
Samples
"Heaven" contains interpolations of "Sexual Healing," written by Odell Brown, Jr., Marvin Gaye, and David Ritz and performed by Gaye.
"You Got Me" contains interpolations of "Superstar," written by Bonnie Bramlett, Delany Bramlett, and Leon Russell.
"Read Your Mind (Part 2 The Remix)" contains interpolations of "Come Go with Me," written by Kenneth Gamble and Leon Huff.

Charts

Weekly charts

Year-end charts

Certifications

References

2003 albums
Avant albums
Geffen Records albums
Albums produced by Warryn Campbell